Trapezonotus arenarius is a species of dirt-colored seed bug in the family Rhyparochromidae. It is found in Africa, Europe and Northern Asia (excluding China), North America, and Southern Asia.

Subspecies
These two subspecies belong to the species Trapezonotus arenarius:
 Trapezonotus arenarius arenarius Linnaeus & C., 1758 c g
 Trapezonotus arenarius elengantulus Kiritshenko, A.N. & G.G.E.Scudder, 1973 c g
Data sources: i = ITIS, c = Catalogue of Life, g = GBIF, b = Bugguide.net

References

External links

 

Rhyparochromidae
Articles created by Qbugbot
Insects described in 1758
Taxa named by Carl Linnaeus